Neeskens Kebano (born 10 March 1992) is a professional footballer who plays as an attacking midfielder or winger for Premier League club Fulham and the DR Congo national team. Kebano is a former French youth international having earned caps at under-17, under-18 level, and under-19 level. He made his youth international debut at the 2008 UEFA European Under-17 Championship.

Club career

Early career
Kebano was born in the commune of Montereau-Fault-Yonne, Île-de-France. He was given his first name as an homage to the former Dutch international midfielder Johan Neeskens whom his father, Nestor Kebano, admired. Kebano was immersed into football at an early age and began his career playing for hometown club ASA Montereau. While at Montereau, he also competed in judo before opting to focus on football. In 2004, Kebano was among a host of players attempting to earn selection to the Clairefontaine academy. While at the academy's detection camp, he drew interest from Paris Saint-Germain scout Pierre Reynaud. The club contacted the player and offered him a trial at the club, which he accepted. After spending the 2005 season playing at Montereau, Kebano was contacted again by Paris Saint-Germain who brought him in for a second trial in December 2005. In the following January, the club signed him on an aspirant (youth) contract and he joined the club in July 2006.

Paris Saint-Germain
Kebano began his Paris Saint-Germain career at the club's youth academy in the Camp des Loges. He was placed on the club's under-14 team and formed friendships with youth and international teammates Jimmy Kamghain, Alassane Tambe, and Bastien Héry. The combination of the four were particularly instrumental in their youth team's success. With the under-14 team, Kebano won the Championnat Fédéraux de 14 ans. In the next season with the club's under-15 team, he played on the team that won the league and cup double. The team won its league, the Division d'Honneur, and also captured the Coupe de Paris. At under-16 level, Paris Saint-Germain and Kebano won the Championnat National des 16 ans. Though, he is still eligible to compete at youth level, ahead of the 2010–11 season, Kebano was promoted to the club's Championnat de France amateur team in the fourth division. He was also placed onto the club's squad for the UEFA Europa League being assigned the number 38 shirt by manager Antoine Kombouaré.

Kebano made his amateur debut on 8 August 2010 in a 1–0 victory over Bourg-Péronnas. The following week, he scored his first amateur goal in a 4–1 win over Monts d'Or Azergues. After rotating between the club's reserve and Coupe Gambardella teams in the fall campaign, in December 2011, Kebano was called up to the senior team for the first time to participate in the club's final Europa League group stage match against Ukrainian club Karpaty Lviv. He appeared on the substitute's bench, but failed to make his debut as Paris Saint-Germain and Karpaty drew 1–1. After the winter break, Kebano returned to the club's reserve team and spent January playing with the team. In February 2011, he was called back up to the senior team after being named to the 18-man roster to play amateur club Martigues in the Coupe de France. On 2 February, Kebano made his professional debut in the match appearing as a substitute for Mevlüt Erdinç in a 4–1 victory. He scored his first professional goal for the club on 2 March 2011 in a 2–0 win over Le Mans in the quarter-finals of the Coupe de France.

On 14 August 2012, Kebano was loaned to Ligue 2 side SM Caen. As the 2012–13 season ended, Kebano was released to Charleroi.

Fulham
On 26 August 2016, Kebano signed for Fulham on a three-year contract for an undisclosed fee, with a club option for an additional 12 months. He scored his first goal for Fulham in a 3–2 win against Wigan Athletic on 11 February 2017.

On 27 July 2020, in the first leg of the 2020 Championship play-offs semi-final against Cardiff City, Kebano scored directly from a free kick in his third consecutive match, becoming the first player to achieve this feat in the top four English divisions since Wayne Rooney.

Middlesbrough (loan)
On 1 February 2021, Kebano joined Championship side Middlesbrough on loan for the remainder of the 2020–21 season. Five days later, he made his debut for Boro, being included in the starting line-up for a 4–1 home league defeat by Brentford. On 13 February 2021, he scored his first goal for Middlesbrough in a 2–1 away defeat by Derby County.

International career
Kebano is now a DR Congo international player. His first game was against Ivory Coast in Abidjan on 15 October 2014. His team won 3–4 and he scored the very first goal of the game after 23 minutes. In the past he was a French youth international having earned caps at under-17, under-18 level, and under-19 level. With the under-17 team, he went unnoticed by coach Philippe Bergeroo until the Elite Round of qualification for the 2009 UEFA European Under-17 Championship when he was finally called up to the team. Kebano made his youth international debut on 24 March 2009 in the team's first Elite Round group stage match against Belarus. He appeared in the team's next group stage match against Norway and, after France qualified for the competition, was named to the team to participate in the 2009 UEFA European Under-17 Championship. Kebano appeared in all three group stage matches as France were eliminated without procuring a victory. In the team's final group stage match against Italy, Kebano scored the opening goal in a 2–1 defeat.

With the under-18 team, Kebano made his debut on 27 October 2009 in a friendly match against Denmark. He scored his first goal for the team on 10 December in a 1–1 draw with the Ukraine. At the 2010 edition of the Copa del Atlantico on the Canary Islands, Kebano scored the second goal in a 4–2 rout of Spain. He finished the under-18 campaign with eight appearances and two goals. Kebano was called up to the under-19 team in August 2010 to play in the Sendai Cup in Japan. He appeared in all three matches as France finished in third place. In October 2010, he played in qualification matches for the 2011 UEFA European Under-19 Championship. On 10 October, in the team's second group stage match against Montenegro, Kebano scored the opening goal in a 2–0 victory.

Career statistics

Club

International
Scores and results list DR Congo's goal tally first

Honours
Fulham
EFL Championship: 2021–22
EFL Championship play-offs: 2020

Individual
Ebony Shoe: 2015

References

External links

Profile at the Fulham F.C. website
 
 

1992 births
Living people
People from Montereau-Fault-Yonne
Footballers from Seine-et-Marne
French sportspeople of Democratic Republic of the Congo descent
Citizens of the Democratic Republic of the Congo through descent
Democratic Republic of the Congo footballers
French footballers
Association football midfielders
Paris Saint-Germain F.C. players
Stade Malherbe Caen players
R. Charleroi S.C. players
Fulham F.C. players
Middlesbrough F.C. players
Ligue 1 players
Ligue 2 players
Belgian Pro League players
Premier League players
English Football League players
France youth international footballers
Democratic Republic of the Congo international footballers
2015 Africa Cup of Nations players
2017 Africa Cup of Nations players
French expatriate footballers
Democratic Republic of the Congo expatriate footballers
French expatriate sportspeople in Belgium
French expatriate sportspeople in England
Democratic Republic of the Congo expatriate sportspeople in Belgium
Democratic Republic of the Congo expatriate sportspeople in England
Expatriate footballers in Belgium
Expatriate footballers in England
Black French sportspeople